Mark Chance is an American chemist currently interested in structural and cellular proteomics. He is currently the Charles W. and Iona A. Mathias Professor of Cancer Research at Case Western Reserve University.

Chance was elected a fellow of the American Association for the Advancement of Science for his contributions to advancements in structural biology and chemistry.

References

Fellows of the American Association for the Advancement of Science
Case Western Reserve University faculty
21st-century American biologists
Living people
Year of birth missing (living people)